(Montague) David Eder (1 August 1865 – 30 March 1936) was a British psychoanalyst, physician, Zionist and writer of Lithuanian Jewish descent. He was best known for advancing psychoanalytic studies in Great Britain.

Education and medical training 

Eder studied medicine at St. Bartholomew's Hospital in London. Following the completion of his studies, he travelled through the United States, South Africa, Colombia (where he visited his uncle James Martin Eder), and Bolivia, where he became a non-commissioned military surgeon for the Bolivian Army.

Eder returned to London in 1900 and went into general practice. His interest in paediatric medicine led to his appointment as Medical Officer of the London School Clinic in 1908 and of the Nursery School at Deptford in 1910. He was also the editor of the medical journal School Hygiene.

In the First World War, Eder joined the British Army, serving in the Royal Army Medical Corps. As a temporary captain, he was appointed medical officer in charge of the psycho-neurological department in Malta. He would later recall the physical and mental injuries suffered by the frontline troops in his 1917 book War-Shock, The Psycho-neuroses in War: Psychology and Treatment.

Psychoanalysis 

During the early 1910s, Eder became interested in the psychoanalytical theories emerging from Europe. Writing as M. D. Eder, he provided English-language translation for works by Carl Jung (Diagnostic Association Studies and The Theory of Psychoanalysis) and Sigmund Freud (Dream Psychology: Psychoanalysis for Beginners and On Dreams). Eder would later prefer the Freudian approach to the Jungian approach.

Eder also authored original articles on psychoanalysis. His influence stretched beyond medical circles: the novelist D. H. Lawrence alluded to Eder's pamphlet The State Endowment of Motherhood in the book The White Peacock.

Major studies 

In 1932 he was elected president of the medical section of the British Psychological Society. That year, he presented his 1932 study The Management of the Nervous Patient. First presented at the London Jewish Hospital Medical Society, the paper called for the combination of psychoanalysis into the process of medical diagnosis. "When this is not feasible," he said, "the physician's intelligence...must be employed to guide his patient to a measure of mental wholeness."

Also in 1932, Eder presented his concept of the Myth of Progress. Writing in the British Journal of Medical Psychology, Eder argued that while civilization is moving forward due to advances in science, politics and technology, these advances are actually contributing to greater unhappiness as man perceives a loss of control over his environment.

Politics 

Outside of his medical work, Eder was active in Britain's Socialist politics and was involved in the Fabian Society, the leading British socialist organisation. As a supporter of the Zionist cause, Eder served on the Zionist Executive in Palestine from 1921 to 1927, and was later president of the Zionist Federation of Great Britain. Eder was opposed to dividing Palestine into two states, and was quoted as saying: "There can be only one national home in Palestine, and that a Jewish one, and no equality in the partnership between Jews and Arabs."

References

External links
 

1865 births
1936 deaths
Jewish British scientists
Psychology writers
British Army personnel of World War I
British Zionists
Royal Army Medical Corps officers
Bolivian military personnel
Jewish physicians
British psychologists
British psychoanalysts
Jewish psychoanalysts
Analysands of Sándor Ferenczi
Analysands of Ernest Jones
Analysands of Victor Tausk
Analysands of Sigmund Freud
Translators of Sigmund Freud